São Tomé is the capital and largest city of the Central African island country of São Tomé and Príncipe. Its name is Portuguese for "Saint Thomas". Founded in the 15th century, it is one of Africa's oldest colonial cities.

History

Álvaro Caminha founded the colony of São Tomé in 1493. The Portuguese came to São Tomé in search of land to grow sugarcane. The island was uninhabited before the arrival of the Portuguese sometime around 1470. The nearby African Kingdom of Kongo eventually became a source of slave labor as well. The island of São Tomé was the main center of sugar production in the sixteenth century; it was overtaken by Brazil by 1600.

São Tomé is centred on a sixteenth-century cathedral, that was largely rebuilt in the 19th century. Another early building is Fort São Sebastião, built in 1566 and now the São Tomé National Museum. On July 9, 1595, a slave revolt led by Rei Amador took control of the capital; they were subjugated in 1596. In 1599, the Dutch took the city as well as the islands for two days; they re-occupied it in 1641 for a year. The city served as the capital of the Portuguese colony of São Tomé and Príncipe and, from São Tomé and Príncipe's independence in 1975, as capital of the sovereign nation.

Geography

Important as a port, São Tomé is located on Ana Chaves Bay in the northeast of São Tomé Island, and Ilhéu das Cabras lies nearby offshore. São Tomé is located northeast of Trindade, southeast of Guadalupe and northwest of Santana. It is linked to these towns by a highway which encircles the entire island of São Tomé. It is linked to Cape Verde by a weekly ferry.

Features of the town include the Presidential Palace, the cathedral, and a cinema. The city is also home to schools, and middle schools, high schools, one polytechnic, two markets, three radio stations, the public television station TVSP, several clinics and hospitals, the country's main airport - São Tomé International Airport (with direct regular scheduled flights to Angola, Gabon, Ghana and Portugal as well as occasional domestic flights to Príncipe), and many squares (praças). São Tomé also serves as the centre of the island's road and bus networks The town is well known for the tchiloli playing.

Population history

Transport
São Tomé is served by São Tomé International Airport  with regular flights to Europe and other African Countries.

Climate
São Tomé features a tropical wet and dry climate (Köppen As), although it is not far above a semi-arid climate (BSh) due to the influence of the cold Benguela Current, which makes even the wettest months drier than would be expected for such a low latitude but at the same time makes the city very cloudy and foggy even during the almost rainless dry season mid-year. The city has a relatively lengthy wet season from October through May and a short dry season. São Tomé sees on average just under  of rainfall per year.

Education
 University of São Tomé and Príncipe, formed in 2016
 National Lyceum
 Patrice Lumumba Preparatory School
 National Library of São Tomé and Príncipe

The following Portuguese international schools are in the city:
 Escola Portuguesa de S. Tomé
 Instituto Diocesano de Formação João Paulo II
 Escola Bambino
 Escola Internacional de S. Tomé e Príncipe

Health
The main hospital of the country is Hospital Ayres de Menezes.

Sports
Sports clubs based in the city include Sporting Praia Cruz and Vitória FC based in the neighborhood of Riboque.  All clubs play at Estádio Nacional 12 de Julho.

Places of worship 

Among the places of worship, they are predominantly Christian churches and temples : Roman Catholic Diocese of São Tomé and Príncipe (Catholic Church), Universal Church of the Kingdom of God, Assemblies of God.

Gallery

Notable people
 José Vianna da Motta (1868–1948) Portuguese pianist, teacher and composer
 Alfredo Azancot (1872-??) Portuguese architect who emigrated to Chile
 Almada Negreiros (1893–1970) Portuguese artist, created literature and painting, and developed ballet choreographies
 Francisco José Tenreiro (1921–1963) geographer, poet and writer of the colonial era
 Alda Neves da Graça do Espírito Santo (1926–2010) poet working in Portuguese, who also served in the Santomean government after independence
 Guadalupe de Ceita (born 1929) writer and a doctor and national hero 
 Miguel Trovoada (born 1936) was Prime Minister 1975–1979 and President 1991–2001 of São Tomé and Príncipe
 Fradique de Menezes (born 1942) President of São Tomé and Príncipe from 2003 to 2011
 Olinda Beja (born 1946) poet, writer and narrator, emigrated to Portugal and moved to Viseu
 Tomé Vera Cruz (born 1956) Prime Minister of São Tomé and Príncipe from April 2006 to February 2008
 Conceição Lima (born 1961) poet from the town of Santana
 Patrice Trovoada (born 1962) politician, Prime Minister of São Tomé and Príncipe 2008 to June 2008, 2010 to December 2012 and since November 2014 
 Aurélio Martins (born 1966) journalist, businessman and politician

Sports
 Nuno Espírito Santo (born 1974) retired Portuguese footballer, Portuguese association football manager
 Naide Gomes (born 1979) former heptathlete and long jumper, competed in 100 metres hurdles at the 2000 Summer Olympics
 Lasset Costa, (born 1986) footballer
 Yazaldes Nascimento (born 1986) Portuguese athlete, runs the 100 metres, competed in the 2004 Summer Olympics
 Alcino Silva (born 1990) sprint canoer, competed in the 2008 Summer Olympics in Beijing
 Harramiz (born 1990) professional footballer who plays in Portugal 
 Zé (born 1991) footballer
 Buly Da Conceição Triste (born 1991) sprint canoeist, competed at the 2016 Summer Olympics
 Faduley (born 1992) footballer in Portugal
 Charles Monteiro (born 1994) footballer who plays in Portugal
 Gilson Costa (born 1996) Portuguese professional footballer
 Romário Leitão (born 1997) long distance runner, competed at the 2016 Summer Olympics in the men's 5000 metres
 Gedson Fernandes (born 1999) Portuguese professional footballer

International relations

São Tomé is twinned with:

 Kingstown, Saint Vincent and the Grenadines
 Luanda, Angola
 Libreville, Gabon
 Accra, Ghana
 Lisbon, Portugal

References

External links

www.saotome.st - Facts about the country, how to get there, where to stay, what to do, images etc.

 
Capitals in Africa
Populated places in Água Grande District
1485 establishments
15th-century establishments in Africa
Former Portuguese colonies
Populated places established in the 1480s
Pleistocene shield volcanoes